The Sucat–Paco–Araneta–Balintawak Transmission Line (abbreviated as SA, 8LI1QUE-DIM, 8LI1DIM-MNA, 8LI1MNA-MUN,) also known as Muntinlupa–Manila–Doña Imelda–Quezon Transmission Line, is a 230,000 volt, single-circuit, three-part transmission line in Metro Manila, Philippines that connects Sucat and Balintawak substations of National Grid Corporation of the Philippines (NGCP), with line segment termination at NGCP Araneta substation in Quezon City and Manila Electric Company (Meralco) Paco substation in Paco, Manila.

History

The Sucat–Paco–Araneta–Balintawak Transmission Line began construction in 1996 and went into service in 2000. It is operated by the privately-owned National Grid Corporation of the Philippines (NGCP) since January 15, 2009, and previously by government-owned companies National Transmission Corporation (TransCo) and National Power Corporation (NAPOCOR). It was owned previously by NAPOCOR from 2000 to March 1, 2003 and is owned currently by TransCo since March 1, 2003.

With the construction of the Skyway Stage 3, several steel poles are being replaced by newer ones specifically those along the Araneta segment and also added new poles on certain portions of the line.

Route description 
The Sucat–Paco–Araneta–Balintawak Transmission Line passes through the cities of Muntinlupa, Taguig, Makati, Manila, and Quezon City. The Sucat–Paco and Paco–Araneta segments are under NGCP's South Luzon Operations and Maintenance (SLOM) District 1 (South Western Tagalog) while the Araneta–Balintawak segment is under North Luzon Operations and Maintenance (NLOM) District 7 (National Capital Region).

Sucat–Paco 

The transmission line starts at Sucat Substation where it parallels Manuel L. Quezon Avenue and Laguna Lake Highway before it turns left. It then passes to Diego Silang Village and parallels with Carlos P. Garcia Avenue. It goes to the left again, passing through Manila American Cemetery and Bonifacio Heights before paralleling to South Luzon Expressway (SLEx) from Maricaban Creek to Magallanes Interchange and Osmeña Highway from Magallanes Interchange to Quirino Avenue. At Magallanes Interchange, it crosses to Epifanio delos Santos Avenue (EDSA). It continues on a straight route and after crossing Gil Puyat Avenue are 7 new steel poles that were used for the relocation of the line due to the construction of Skyway Stage 3. It crosses to San Andres Bukid and Paco. The cut-in connection to Meralco Paco substation is located in this district, where the line's Sucat–Paco section ends.

Paco–Araneta 
The line parallels to Tomas Claudio Street (or Paco–Santa Mesa Road), PNR Metro Commuter railroad and Magsaysay Boulevard, turns left to Gregorio Araneta Avenue and run parallel with the said avenue and Skyway Stage 3, and the line's Paco–Araneta section ends at Araneta Substation.

Araneta–Balintawak 

The line continues paralleling Araneta Avenue and Skyway Stage 3 until it passes to Valentin Ventura Street, Tuktukan Street, and Kaingin Road before it crosses to EDSA. It turns left and after a few meters is the transmission line's terminus which is Balintawak Substation.

Technical description
The transmission line consists of 214 steel poles (54 on the Balintawak–Araneta segment (1–54) and 160 on the Araneta–Paco and Paco–Sucat segments (1–8, 30-149, 150A, 150B, and 155–185)), 26 lattice towers (9-29, 150, and 151–154), and 1 portal tower located between steel poles 49 and 50 ((8LI1MNA-MUN)97) totaling to 241 transmission structures. Steel poles have flag tower design (suspension and anchor variants), while lattice towers have incomplete tower design. Portal towers are used on portions of the line where it intersects with another power line. It has a length of 34 kilometers (21 mi) and is a single-circuit, double-bundle power line.

From 2000 until the completion of the line's cut-in connection to Manila Electric Company (Meralco) Paco Substation, it was a two-part power line. Due to the construction of the line's cut-in connection to Meralco Paco Substation, two new steel poles were added between poles 143 and 144 of the Sucat–Araneta segment of the line. This cut-in connection to the said substation also made the transmission line from being a two-part to three-part power line.

In 2018, a portal tower located between steel poles 53 and 54 ((8LI1MNA-MUN)92) was removed and retired to give way for the widening of Lawton Avenue in Taguig.

Health controversy 
The SLEx (Makati) – Bonifacio Heights (Taguig) segment of Sucat–Paco–Araneta–Balintawak Transmission Line was criticized by the residents living along the Tamarind Road in Dasmariñas Village, Makati, who claimed the transmission line pose health risks. The said segment is located within 10 meters of Tamarind Road in the said village. The residents, led by Atty. Eduardo F. Hernandez, blamed the electromagnetic fields (EMF) emanated by the 230-kV power lines for such health issues as cancer, leukemia, and miscarriage. They also took note of no consultation with regards to the construction of the transmission line.

A case was filed in Makati Regional and Metropolitan Trial Court (Makati RTC) in 2000, but was raised to the Supreme Court after failed negotiations. Responding to the petition filed by the residents, the Supreme Court ruled in 2006 that the safety issue of the lines was "evidentiary in nature," although they took note of the potential health risks due to EMF radiation exposure with regards to the scientific studies. The Court also added that long-term human safety should be of paramount importance as opposed to the presumption of economic benefits. Citing the said ruling, the Makati RTC in October 2008 obliged the National Transmission Corporation (TransCo) to "de-energize" the Sucat–Paco–Araneta–Balintawak Transmission Line.

TransCo vice president for operations Carlito Claudio warned in November 2008 that complete retirement of the transmission line could trigger "hours-long rotating blackouts, just like during the power crisis in the 1990s," that might adversely impact the country's leading economic hubs of Makati and Ortigas, and added the unfeasibility of building an alternate underground cable line that would cost  billion. Former TransCo president Alan Ortiz noted the transmission line as a crucial line, and said claims of electromagnetic radiation associated with high-voltage transmission lines like this "have yet to be 100-percent scientifically established." TransCo submitted a motion to the Supreme Court asking that they be granted until January 31, 2009 to carry out activities and coordination works in alleviating the impact of the impending shutdown, but was refused and instead supported the Makati RTC's decision in shutting the transmission line down.

In its February 5, 2013 order, the Makati RTC approved the request of the petitioners, referring the case back to another branch following the failure of the judicial dispute resolution. The case is still pending at its pre-trial stage.

Gallery

Notes

References

External links
 Philippines_Sucat_Balintawak_2007.pdf - 2007 evaluation by Entwicklungsbank.de

Energy infrastructure completed in 2000
Transmission lines in the Philippines